The non-marine molluscs of Azerbaijan are a part of the molluscan fauna of Azerbaijan, which is part of the wildlife of Azerbaijan.

Freshwater gastropods 
Species of freshwater gastropods of Azerbaijan include:

Land gastropods 
Species of land gastropods of Azerbaijan include:

Trigonochlamydidae
 Hyrcanolestes velitaris (Martens, 1880)
 Trigonochlamys imitatrix O. Boettger, 1881

Freshwater bivalves
Species of freshwater bivalves of Azerbaijan include:

See also
Lists of molluscs of surrounding countries:
 List of non-marine molluscs of Russia
 List of non-marine molluscs of Georgia (country)
 List of non-marine molluscs of Armenia
 List of non-marine molluscs of Iran

References

Molluscs

Molluscs
Azerbaijan
Azerbaijan